Richard Iddon (22 June 1901 – 26 February 1975) was an English footballer. His regular position was as a forward. He was born in Tarleton, Lancashire. He played for Manchester United, Tarleton, Preston North End, Leyland, and Chorley.

External links
MUFCInfo.com profile

1901 births
1975 deaths
People from Tarleton
English footballers
Association football forwards
Preston North End F.C. players
Leyland F.C. players
Chorley F.C. players
Manchester United F.C. players
English Football League players